Yamakay (Yamaqay) is a rural locality (a selo) and the administrative centre of Yamakayevsky Selsoviet, Blagovarsky District, Bashkortostan, Russia. The population was 232 as of 2010. There are 3 streets.

Geography 
Yamakay is located 16 km southeast of Yazykovo (the district's administrative centre) by road. Barsuan is the nearest rural locality.

References 

Rural localities in Blagovarsky District